Northeastern Bible College was founded by Charles W. Anderson and first opened in September 1950 as Northeastern Bible Institute, at the Brookdale Baptist Church in Bloomfield, New Jersey. The college relocated to a campus in Essex Fells in the fall of 1952. The name was changed in 1964 to Northeastern Collegiate Bible Institute, and finally in 1973 to Northeastern Bible College.

Northeastern won the 1st official NCCAA D-I Soccer Championship in the Fall 1973 and in the spring of 1974, was granted full accreditation by the Middle States Association of Colleges and Schools. The school closed in 1990 because of financial difficulties and low enrollment, but the board of trustees was required by its by-laws to give the institution's assets to a like-minded organization before it could disband. The college library, containing 27,000 volumes of Bible and theology resources, was later acquired by The Master's University in Santa Clarita, California, in 1990. The King's College, which had closed its Briarcliff Manor, NY campus in 1994 because of its own financial difficulties, was revived in 1998 and received Northeastern's monetary assets in 1999. This allowed King's to lease two floors in the Empire State Building, where it operated until relocating to Lower Manhattan, near Wall Street, in 2012. Northeastern Bible College served over 4,000 students, and 70% of its alumni are engaged in full-time Christian service.

School presidents
Charles W. Anderson, 1950-1980
J. Gordon Henry, 1980-1984
Robert Benton, 1984-1987
James Bjornstad, 1987-1990

Alumni and Transcript Information
Transcripts for Northeastern Bible College (as well as for King's College) are available from the National Student Clearinghouse.  To request a transcript, click the following link, and then start typing one of the following:
     Northeastern Bible College
     The King’s College
     The King’s College at Briarcliff Manor
and the form will fill in the rest for you.

     https://tsorder.studentclearinghouse.org/school/select

References

External links
The King's College official website
Alumni & Transcript Info for The King's College and Northeastern Bible College

 
Defunct private universities and colleges in New Jersey
Universities and colleges in Essex County, New Jersey
Educational institutions established in 1950
1950 establishments in New Jersey
Seminaries and theological colleges in New Jersey